Climacia is a genus of spongillaflies in the family Sisyridae. There are more than 20 described species in Climacia.

Species
These 22 species belong to the genus Climacia:

 Climacia amalla Flint, 1998
 Climacia antillana Alayo, 1968
 Climacia areolaris (Hagen, 1861)
 Climacia basalis Banks, 1913
 Climacia bifasciata Penny & Rafael, 1982
 Climacia bimaculata Banks, 1913
 Climacia californica Chandler, 1953
 Climacia carpenteri Parfin & Gurney, 1956
 Climacia chapini Parfin & Gurney, 1956
 Climacia chilena Parfin & Gurney, 1956
 Climacia desordenata Monserrat, 2005
 Climacia doradensis Flint, 1998
 Climacia insolita Flint, 1998
 Climacia lemniscata Flint, 1998
 Climacia negrensis Penny, 1981
 Climacia nota Parfin & Gurney, 1956
 Climacia punctulata Flint, 2006
 Climacia striata Parfin & Gurney, 1956
 Climacia tenebra Parfin & Gurney, 1956
 Climacia townesi Parfin & Gurney, 1956
 Climacia triplehorni Flint, 1998
 Climacia versicolor Flint, 1998

References

Further reading

 

Hemerobiiformia
Articles created by Qbugbot